Buldyrya is a rural locality (a settlement) in Cherdynsky District, Perm Krai, Russia. The population was 111 as of 2010. There are 6 streets.

Geography 
Buldyrya is located 94 km northeast of Cherdyn (the district's administrative centre) by road. Berezovo is the nearest rural locality.

References 

Rural localities in Cherdynsky District